Tehriyali or (Gangapariya) or simply ("Tehri Garhwali") is a dialect of Garhwali, belonging to the Central Pahari group (per Grierson). It is mostly spoken  in the Tehri Garhwal district of Uttarakhand state.

Script & specimen

References

Northern Indo-Aryan languages
Tehri Garhwal district